Kang Bong-kyun (May 13, 1943 – January 31, 2017) was a South Korean economist and politician who served as Minister of Finance from 1999 to 2000 during the height and aftermath of the Asian financial crisis. Kang was appointed Finance Minister by President Kim Dae-jung at a time when many other politicians and civil servants refused to take the cabinet position. The financial crisis stemmed from reckless borrowing and spending from the South Korean banking sector, as well as mismanagement by the chaebol, or South Korean business conglomerates.

Though Kang held the portfolio of Minister of Finance for less than a year, he is credited with guiding the South Korean economy through the most difficult period in the country's history. His work laid the foundation for the economy's eventual recovery and return to growth following the financial crisis. Under Kang, South Korea implemented higher standards governing the accounting practices of privately held and listed conglomerates and corporations. He also established harsher financial regulations.

Kang stepped down in 2000 after less than a year in office when he was appointed to lead the state-run Korea Development Institute.

Kang Bong-kyun died on Jan. 31, 2017, at age 74.

References

1943 births
2017 deaths
Finance ministers of South Korea
South Korean economists
Seoul National University alumni
Williams College alumni
Hanyang University alumni